Franklin's grouse (Canachites canadensis franklinii) is a subspecies of the spruce grouse found in the Northwest Territories, British Columbia and Alberta.

Taxonomy
In 2014, it was split by the IUCN as a distinct species from the spruce grouse Canachites canadensis after being considered a subspecies. However, as of early 2021 the International Ornithological Congress (IOC), the American Ornithological Society, and the Clements taxonomy retain C. f. franklinii and C. f. isleibi as subspecies of spruce grouse.

An isolated population, now treated as a distinct subspecies C. c. isleibi (or C. f. isleibi when franklinii is considered a distinct species), is found on Prince of Wales Island and the nearby Alexander Archipelago in southeast Alaska.

Description
It closely resembles other subspecies of the spruce grouse, but the male's tail is entirely black, lacking the chestnut terminal tail band of the spruce grouse, and has white spots overlying it.

Behaviour
Territorial males are notable for their wing-clap display. At the end of a short flight through the trees, the wings are brought together over the back so as to produce two sharp claps, about 0.5 s apart, loud enough to be heard by the human ear 150 m away. These territorial displays can sometimes be elicited by similar hand clapping, and can be used to detect male territories and estimate their density.

References

Tetraonini
Grouse
Birds described in 1829
Birds of the United States
Birds of Canada
Subspecies